Dermatodothis is a genus of fungi in the class Dothideomycetes. The relationship of this taxon to other taxa within the class is unknown (incertae sedis). The genus was described by Polish botanist Marjan Raciborski in 1914.

Species
Dermatodothis buddlejae
Dermatodothis euonymi
Dermatodothis jahnii
Dermatodothis japonica
Dermatodothis javanica
Dermatodothis quercicola
Dermatodothis symploci
Dermatodothis zeylanica

See also
List of Dothideomycetes genera incertae sedis

References

Dothideomycetes enigmatic taxa
Dothideomycetes genera